The  Utah Blaze season was the sixth season for the franchise in the Arena Football League. The team was coached by Ron James and played its home games at EnergySolutions Arena for the second straight year. The Blaze finished the regular season 12–6 and qualified for the playoffs. They made it to the National Conference championship game where they played the Arizona Rattlers, but were on the losing end of a 75–69 score.

Standings

Schedule

Regular season
The Blaze began the season in San Antonio against the San Antonio Talons on March 10. Their home opener was on March 24 against the San Jose SaberCats. They played the Philadelphia Soul in their final regular season game on July 22.

Playoffs

Final roster

References

Utah Blaze
Utah Blaze seasons
Utah Blaze